Carl William Bell (born January 9, 1967) is an American songwriter, record producer, arranger, engineer, and mixer. He founded the multi-platinum selling hard rock band Fuel in 1989, serving as the principal lyricist, lead guitarist, and record producer for the band during its inception and peak commercial success. He has written singles such as "Shimmer", "Hemorrhage (In My Hands)", and "Bad Day" as well as many other songs. He also co-produced all Fuel records including the Grammy nominated Natural Selection (2003). Although often a backing vocalist for the band, Bell never performed as a lead singer until releasing his first solo project in 2017.

Fuel
"Hemorrhage (In My Hands)" was the No. 1 Active Rock song for 13 weeks and became the No. 5 Rock Song of the Decade, according to Billboards Best of the 2000s Rock Songs Charts.
  
In 2013, "Hemorrhage (In My Hands)" became the No. 6 Alternative Rock song of the past 25 years, according to Billboard's Alternative Chart 25th Anniversary: Top 100 Songs.

Hiatus from Fuel
After departing from Fuel in 2010, Bell began focusing further on working with various other artists and writers as well as on the production of TV and movie soundtracks.

In 2021, Bell returned for Fuel's latest album, Ånomåly, after he had started rehearsing with a revamped line-up in 2020, including a new lead singer.

Collaborations
Bell began working with the band Sandlot Heroes as well as writing and composing with various other artists.

Bell contributed an unreleased Fuel song "Sister Mary Innocent" renamed "Sister Mary" on Tommy Lee's 2005 solo album Tommyland: The Ride. He also plays guitar on the track.

Bell wrote a song "When You Come Around" with Chris Daughtry intended for the eponymous 2006 debut album of his rock band Daughtry, but it didn't make the final cut. Instead, Daughtry has been playing it live.

Bell performed all instruments and vocals for a cover of "Calendar Girl." This was used as the opening song for Miss Hawaiian Tropic.

Bell co-wrote the song "Ghost" with One Less Reason for their 2010 album Faces and Four Letter Words.

Bell wrote the first single for NBC's The Voice contestant Jared Blake. Released in 2013, "Countryfied" was written by Bell, Jared Blake, and Skidd Mills.  Bell continues to work and write in various genres in Nashville, Los Angeles, and elsewhere.

Solo record

In 2017, Bell announced that he would be putting out his first solo record, a country project as a tribute to his Dad, titled Tennessee Fuel that was released under his own full name, Carl Bell. The album is available on iTunes and all other major outlets as well. With a release date of June 16, Bell set up a Facebook page and other sites to support the project. Both sites explain the transition of his move to country, with an EPK video as well as a dedication of song called "Dad" to his late father. Bell arranged, produced, recorded, engineered, and mixed the record as well as performed all instruments and vocals other than drums for the record.

Bell's return to FUEL and new record ÅNOMÅLY (2020–present)
Sometime in 2020, Bell, founding member and primary songwriter of FUEL, decided to return to the band, forming a new version of group. According to Bell, this was more or less a rebirth of Fuel and a new era for the band. Bell reunited with former drummer Kevin Miller to reform the group. Together they recruited a new singer, John Corsale, who at the time was the frontman for Miller's band. They began rehearsing in summer of 2020, and later began working on what would become Fuel's 6th full-length album. During that time, the band also released Something Like Human on vinyl for the first time.

Fuel's newest album, ÅNOMÅLY, was released on October 22, 2021. Bell wrote all the songs on ANOMALY, performed all the instruments on the album, recorded, arranged, produced and mixed the album.  The first single, "Hard", was released on July 9. The album's second single, "Don't Say I", was released on August 20, 2021. The album's 11 songs feature vocals by Corsale. Miller, along with new members Mark Klotz (rhythm guitar, backing vocals) and Tommy Nat (bass) do not perform on the album but are featured in the videos and live performances. The cover art and track listing was revealed on August 28.

Since the album's release, the band has been performing various shows live in the US, and has more shows and some major festival dates scheduled for 2022.

References

External links
 Carl Bell country album Tennessee Fuel available on iTunes 
 Facebook page
 carlbellmusic.com
 Songs composed by Carl Bell on AllMusic
 Songs composed by Carl Bell click 'songs' tab on Music VF

1967 births
Living people
People from Kenton, Tennessee
Fuel (band) members
American rock guitarists
American male guitarists
American rock singers
Lead guitarists
21st-century American guitarists
21st-century American male singers
21st-century American singers